WSHS may refer to the following schools:

Willetton Senior High School in Willeton, Western Australia
Williamsville South High School in Williamsville, New York
Wallkill Senior High School
West Salem High School (Oregon) in Salem, Oregon
West Salem High School (Wisconsin) in West Salem, Wisconsin
West Scranton High School
West Seattle High School
West Side High School
West Shamokin High School
West Shores High School
West Springfield High School (Virginia)
Westfields Sports High School
White Station High School in Memphis, Tennessee
Winona Senior High School in Winona County, Minnesota
Winter Springs High School in Winter Springs, Florida
Woodbridge Senior High School

WSHS may also refer to 
WSHS (FM), a high school/public radio station in Sheboygan, Wisconsin

An acronym for the Washington State Historical Society
Western Steppe Herders, an ethno-cultural ancestral group in the Eneolithic and Bronze Age